Hayter is an unincorporated community in Washington County, in the U.S. state of Virginia. It has an elevation of 2,149 ft (655 m).

References

Unincorporated communities in Virginia
Unincorporated communities in Washington County, Virginia